Le Guide musical (English: The Music Guide) was a weekly French-language Belgian and French classical music periodical founded 1 March 1855 in Brussels by Peter Bernhard Schott (1821–1873), of the Brussels music publishing house Schott frères (Schott brothers).

Editors and history
Maurice Kufferath (1852–1919) was editor from 1887 to 1891. In 1889, the editorial office relocated to Paris and began publishing from both Paris and Brussels. In 1892, Otto Junne, director of Schott frères, sold the periodical to Kufferath, the editor. From 1894 to 1905, Hugues Imbert (1842–1905) became editor-in-chief, then Henri de Curzon (1861–1942). Kufferath preserved the publication's Franco-Belgium character. The periodical ceased publication in 1918.

References
General references
 Worldcat No. 

Inline citations

1855 establishments in Belgium
Magazines published in Belgium
Weekly magazines published in Belgium
Classical music magazines
Defunct magazines published in Belgium
French-language magazines
Music magazines published in France
Magazines established in 1855
Magazines disestablished in 1918
Magazines published in Paris
Magazines published in Brussels
Musicology